Herbert Wahler (born 10 December 1921) served in Einsatzgruppe C and was accused of being involved in the massacre of tens of thousands of Jews in Ukraine, including at Babi Yar. He was included in the list of most-wanted Nazi war criminals in 2018. In March 2020, the public prosecutor's office in Kassel announced that Wahler would not face charges due to a lack of evidence. He turned 100 in December 2021.
As of 2021, he was suspected to be the last living member of Einsatzgruppe C.

See also
 List of most-wanted Nazi war criminals

References 

1921 births
Living people
German centenarians
Men centenarians
Einsatzgruppen personnel
Babi Yar
Place of birth missing (living people)